Louis-Marie, vicomte de Noailles (17 April 1756 Paris7 January 1804 Havana) was the second son of Philippe, duc de Mouchy, and a member of Mouchy branch of the famous Noailles family of the French aristocracy.

Career
He served under his brother-in-law the Marquis de Lafayette in America during the American War for Independence, and was the officer who concluded the capitulation of Yorktown in 1781.

He was elected to the Estates-General in 1789. On 4 August 1789, during the French Revolution, he began the famous "orgy" (as Mirabeau called it) when feudalism was to be abolished, and the Duc d'Aiguilion proposed the abolition of titles and liveries in June 1790.

As the French Revolution progressed and became more dangerous for nobles, he emigrated to the United States and became a partner in William Bingham's Bank of North America in Philadelphia. He was successful in the United States. He accepted a command against the English in San Domingo, under Rochambeau. He commanded a defence of the Môle-Saint-Nicolas and escaped with the garrison to Cuba, but en route there his ship was attacked by a British schooner. After a long engagement, he was severely wounded, and died of his wounds in Havana on 9 January 1804.

Louis Marie Antoine de Noailles was a member of the Society of the Cincinnati from France.

Personal life
He married his cousin Anne Jeanne Baptiste Georgette Adrienne Pauline Louise Catherine Dominique de Noailles (1758–1794), daughter of Jean Louis Paul François de Noailles, Duc de Noailles. They had four children:

 Adrienne Theodore Philippine de Noailles (1778–1781), who died young.
 Count Louis Joseph Alexis de Noailles (1783–1835), who married Cécile de Boisgelin (1797-1836), the only child of Marquis Bruno-Gabriel de Boisgelin and Cécile d'Harcourt-Beuvron.
 Viscount Alfred Louis Dominique Vincent de Paul de Noailles (1784–1812), who married Rosalie Charlotte Antoinette Léontine de Noailles (1797–1851), daughter of Charles Arthur Tristan Languedoc de Noailles.
 Euphemia Cécile Marie Adelaide de Noailles (1790–1870), who married Olivier de Saint-Georges de Vérac, Marquis de Vérac (1768–1858), in 1811.

Noailles died in Havana on 9 January 1804.

Descendants
Through his son Alfred, Viscount de Noailles, he was a grandfather of Anne Marie Cécile de Noailles (1812–1848), who married Charles Philippe Henri de Noailles.

Through his daughter Euphemia, he was a grandfather of Marthe Augustine de Saint-Georges de Vérac, who married Louis Marie Pantaleon Costa, Marquis de Beauregard (1806–1864) in 1834.

References

External links
 Society of the Cincinnati
 American Revolution Institute

Further reading

 François Furstenberg, When the United States Spoke French: Five Refugees Who Shaped a Nation. New York: Penguin, 2014.

1756 births
1804 deaths
Nobility from Paris
French military leaders
Viscounts of Noailles
Names inscribed under the Arc de Triomphe